Gidderbaha Assembly constituency (Sl. No.: 84) is a Punjab Legislative Assembly constituency in Muktsar district, Punjab state, India.

Members of Legislative Assembly

Election results

2022

2017

2012

See also 
Simranjit Singh Mann

Faridkot Lok Sabha constituency

References

External links
  

Assembly constituencies of Punjab, India
Sri Muktsar Sahib district